The Faculty of Science and Engineering is a constituent body of Macquarie University. The Faculty offers undergraduate and postgraduate coursework and research degree programs and is home to a number of internationally recognised research centres and also distinguished research staff. The Science Faculty is based on the Eastern half of the Academic Core at Macquarie University and is located near to the Macquarie University Research Park and the Macquarie University Hospital, thus allowing practical links with industry and research. The Faculty is renowned for its research in such areas as chiropractic science, proteomic analysis, climate risk research, environmental science and ecological studies. According to The Good Universities Guide of Australian Universities, graduates within the Faculty of Science receive starting salaries higher than those who graduate in science disciplines at other Australian universities.

Undergraduate Study 
The Faculty offers bachelor degrees and undergraduate diplomas as part of their undergraduate programs.  The Bachelor of Science offered by the faculty is a flexible program that students can tailor to suit their needs; with 25 majors available for study.

Postgraduate Study 
The Faculty offers postgraduate awards in the form of master's degrees, as coursework and research degrees, doctoral studies and postgraduate diplomas or certificates. Research degrees offered to students are designed to assist students to investigate and contribute to knowledge in their chosen discipline and to develop proficiency in conducting research.

Faculty Departments and Centres 

The Faculty of Science is divided into separate Departments which focus on specific fields of science for research and education purposes. The Excellence in Research for Australia initiative, as part of the Australian Research Council, has recognised several departments in the Faculty for "outstanding performance well above world standard" in the fields of Earth Sciences, Physical Sciences, Environmental Sciences, Biological Sciences, and Psychology and Cognitive Sciences. Centres, also referred as Research Centres, under the Faculty of Science are at the forefront of research in the university and focus on significant and emerging fields in science.

The Faculty encompasses nine departments and twenty-one centres:

Departments 
Department of Biological Sciences
Department of Molecular Sciences
Department of Chiropractic
Department of Computing
Department of Earth and Environmental Sciences
School of Engineering
Department of Mathematics and Statistics
Department of Physics and Astronomy
AAO Macquarie

Centres 
ARC Centre of Excellence for Core to Crust Fluid Systems
Australian Proteome Analysis Facility (APAF)
ARC Centre of Excellence for Engineered Quantum Systems (EQuS)
ARC National Key Centre for Geochemical Evolution and Metallogeny of Continents (GEMOC)
Australian Research Institute for Education in Sustainability (ARIES)
Centre for Advanced Computing - Algorithms and Cryptography
Environmental Biotechnology CRC
Centre for the Integrative Study of Animal Behaviour (CISAB)
Centre for Language Technology
Research Centre in Quantum Science and Technology (QSciTech)
Centre for Ultrahigh-bandwidth Devices for Optical Systems (CUDOS)
Centre of Australian Category Theory
CORE - Climate Risk
Macquarie University Centre for Analytical Biotechnology
MQ Research Centre in Astronomy, Astrophysics and Astrophotonics
Macquarie University Genes to Geosciences Centre
Macquarie University Photonics Research Centre incorporating Centre for Lasers & Applications
Macquarie University BioFocus Research Centre
Numeracy Centre
Risk Frontiers (formerly the Natural Hazards Research Centre)
Biomolecular Frontiers Research Centre

References

External links
 Macquarie University Faculty of Science Website

Macquarie University